Antonio Xavier López Adame (born 9 December 1972) is a Mexican politician from the Ecologist Green Party of Mexico. From 2006 to 2009 he served as Deputy of the LX Legislature of the Mexican Congress representing Oaxaca.

References

1972 births
Living people
Politicians from Mexico City
Ecologist Green Party of Mexico politicians
21st-century Mexican politicians
Deputies of the LX Legislature of Mexico
Members of the Chamber of Deputies (Mexico) for Oaxaca